Parents for Inclusion is a registered charity in the United Kingdom which aims to help parents of children with special educational needs and physical disabilities.  The charity is pro-inclusion and was founded in 1984 as Parents in Partnership.

External links
Official website

Educational charities based in the United Kingdom